The 2016 Georgia State Panthers football team represented Georgia State University (GSU) in the 2016 NCAA Division I FBS football season. The Panthers were led by fourth-year head coach Trent Miles for the first 10 games of the year until he was fired on November 12, 2016 after a 2–8 record. They were led by interim head coach Tim Lappano for the remainder of the season. They played their home games at the Georgia Dome. The 2016 season was the Panthers' fourth in the Sun Belt Conference and seventh since starting football. This was also the Panthers final season in the Georgia Dome, as the stadium was demolished on November 20, 2017 following the opening of Mercedes-Benz Stadium on August 26 of the same year.

Schedule
Georgia State announced its 2016 football schedule on March 3, 2016. The 2016 schedule consists of 6 home and away games in the regular season. The Panthers will host Sun Belt foes Arkansas State, Georgia Southern, Louisiana–Monroe, and Texas State, and will travel to Appalachian State, Idaho, South Alabama, and Troy. Georgia State will skip out on two Sun Belt teams this season, Louisiana–Lafayette and New Mexico State.

The team will play four non–conference games, two home games against Ball State from the Mid-American Conference (MAC) and Tennessee–Martin (UT–Martin) from the Ohio Valley Conference, and two road games against Air Force from the Mountain West Conference and Wisconsin from the Big Ten Conference.

 All ASN games werealso broadcast on ESPN3.

Personnel

Coaching and support staff

Roster

Game summaries

Ball State

at Air Force

at Wisconsin

at Appalachian State

Texas State

at Troy

UT Martin

at South Alabama

Arkansas State

Louisiana–Monroe

Georgia Southern

at Idaho

References

Georgia State
Georgia State Panthers football seasons
Georgia State Panthers football